Vosne Romanee (foaled 17 September 2002) is a three-time Group 1 winning New Zealand Horse. While being a competitive Group 1 horse earlier in his career, he rose to prominence as a seven-year-old in 2009/10. His most significant win came as one of several longshots in the Kelt Capital Stakes in October 2009, and followed up with wins in the Zabeel Classic on Boxing Day and the New Zealand Stakes in March 2010.

The achievements were more notable as the three events were among the most competitive races in New Zealand that season. These wins led to the Vosne Romanee being named the New Zealand Horse of the Year for the 2009/10 season.

Vosne Romanee returned in 2010 to race in the Kelt Capital Stakes. He never travelled comfortably and ran last behind his stablemate Wall Street.

Vosne Romanee is named after a wine region in France. Buddy Lammas was his rider in the Kelt Capital Stakes but has since been regularly in races with Opie Bosson as his regular rider. Vosne Romanee is owned by Ian and Alana Smart Trust. He was trained by Jeff Lynds.

See also

 Thoroughbred racing in New Zealand

References

2002 racehorse births
Racehorses bred in New Zealand
Racehorses trained in New Zealand
Thoroughbred family 9-h